Norma Meras Swenson (born 1932) is an expert in the field of maternal and child health as well as in reproductive and sexual health rights.  Swenson is a founding member of Our Bodies, Ourselves. She was a co-author and editor for many editions of Our Bodies, Ourselves. 

Swenson has a Master of Public Health from the Harvard T.H. Chan School of Public Health in 1998, where she also taught from 2000 to 2017, specializing in Women, Heath, and Development.   

Due to a childhood set in a time where women's education was highly valued and sought after, Swenson formed what is a key part of her lifelong message and current belief: that education determines a person's place in life and, through education, we can help break down walls of inequality.

Our Bodies Ourselves 
In 1970, Swenson along with twelve other women began to create Our Bodies Ourselves (OBOS). Receiving its inspiration from a women's liberation conference in 1969, Our Bodies Ourselves, then known as the Boston Women's Health Book Collective, took form as the twelve women shared their stories surrounding the mistreatment they felt by doctors and the realization of the ignorance about their bodies. Their mission was to offer women more cohesive and non-biased medical information. Ultimately, the OBOS founders shared their research findings in a 193-page booklet called Women and Their Bodies. Their research and personal experiences became the first edition of Our Bodies, Ourselves in 1971. "We were furious about how many men wrote about women’s bodies or sexuality without knowing much, and we weren’t going to write unless we knew what we were talking about," Swenson stated in a 2017 interview with Aging Today.

Swenson also contributed to books such as Ourselves, Growing Older by utilizing her knowledge on topics such as sexuality, childbirth, menopause, housing, work, retirement, money, care giving, medical problems and death, all viewed from the perspective of the older woman in OBOS. The sharing of experiences is a predominant feature of Ourselves, Growing Older as it is in OBOS as well. In creating the book this way, Swenson and the other authors were able to create an environment that allowed women to find support from other women that are in the same predicament. Women took comfort in knowing that others share the problem.

Education 
A graduate of Tufts University, Swenson studied medical sociology, and subsequently won a Danforth Foundation Fellowship to work with the critical sociologist Irving Zola at Brandeis University. Swenson earned an M.P.H (Master of Public Health) from the Harvard School of Public Health (HSPH). After receiving her degree, Swenson taught for twenty years at the Harvard School of Public Health. She taught “Women, Health, and Development” from a global perspective in the Social and Behavioral Sciences Departments at HSPH. While at Harvard she served on the HSPH Alumni Council, and is a founding member and former faculty in the concentration on women, gender, and health. Swenson is also an Affiliate of the Women Gender & Sexuality program at Harvard's Faculty of Arts & Sciences, and a member of the group on Reproductive Health and Rights at the Harvard Center for Population and Development Studies.

She's Beautiful When She's Angry 
The film, She's Beautiful When She's Angry explains the history of the women who founded the modern women's movement from 1966 to 1971. The movie moves from the founding of NOW, with women in hats and gloves, to the beginning of more radical groups of women's liberation. "She's Beautiful When She's Angry" articulates the stories of 30 individual women and the Our Bodies Ourselves collective, all of which fought for their own equality and in the process created a revolution. Created by filmmaker Mary Dore, "She's Beautiful When She's Angry" is the first film about second-wave feminism to illustrate clearly the distinctions between what became the global women's health movement and how, as a movement, OBOS was somewhat closer to the heart of women's liberation than to mainstream feminism at the time. Rather than celebrating "girl power," Dore illustrates an honest, critical, and inclusive image of the history of second wave feminism. "It explains the place of “Our Bodies, Ourselves” in providing a feminist guide to women's health and medical care, while providing a bibliography for who was organizing and how to organize for both local and national change."

Swenson's mother was eight years old when women won the right to vote and electricity came to the immigrant farming community where she was born. By the time Swenson became a mother, she was president of a women’s rights organization. Thus, why Swenson feels, "one of the high points of “She’s Beautiful When She’s Angry” is the tribute paid and the link made to that first wave, which started with such a sweeping agenda and ended after less than a century with the single, narrow goal of giving women the right to vote."

References 

1932 births
Living people
Reproductive rights activists
Sex education advocates
Tufts University alumni
Harvard School of Public Health alumni
Harvard School of Public Health faculty